The Auckland University Law Review is an annual law review published by the University of Auckland since 1967. It covers New Zealand law. The language of publication is English.

References 

New Zealand law journals
English-language journals
Publications established in 1967